São Tomé is a municipality in Paraná, Brazil.  As of 2020, the estimated population was 5,750.

References

Municipalities in Paraná

bpy:সাও টোমে